Escape respirators are a portable breathing apparatus or mask that regenerates breathable air to help provide respiratory protection for emergency escape from areas containing harmful gases or IDLH atmospheres. There are two types of escape respirators: air-purifying escape respirators and self-contained escape respirators. Often times, these respirators utilize an easy-to-put-on hood and some sort of supplied air tank or filter attachment that cleans the incoming air for the user. Escape respirators are not to be used for anything other than escaping a contaminated environment. Escape respirators are not to be used for general or everyday respiratory protection. A cross-breed between a gas mask and a respirator, the escape respirator is used extensively in the mining and chemical industries, and by emergency responders. Escape respirators should be certified by a national authority analogous to the United States' National Institute for Occupational Safety and Health for escaping from the atmosphere in which the respirator is manufactured for.  

The name of the appliance stems from the fact that the emergency respirator is not designed to provide clean air for extended periods of time. Instead, it is a breathing device allowing people working in dangerous conditions to escape in case of an emergency, such as a leak of methane, hydrogen sulfide, or other dangerous gases. Usually, an escape respirator provides protection for under one hour.

Depending on the type, some escape respirators include a breathing gas cylinder, chemicals producing oxygen, or a combination of the two. If a filtration-type escape respirator is utilized, it must also include the proper filter for the type of environment the user will be exposed to. If a tank-style escape respirator is utilized, it will allow the end user to be able to escape any environment that requires respiratory protection. One drawback to escape respirator use is that it offers no chemical protection to the rest of the user's body. If this scenario may be encountered, additional personal protective equipment may be needed to ensure full protection from the hazards present. Escape respirators offer nothing but short-term respiratory protection. 

The CDC describes limitations that a user should take into consideration. The following is taken directly from CDC's website.

"Cautions and Limitations – Air-Purifying Escape Respirators and Self-Contained Escape Respirators: 
The following Cautions and Limitations statements shall be prominently displayed in the respirator user instructions:

 This respirator is to be used for escape only and will protect against the inhalation of certain respiratory hazards.
 Not for use in atmospheres containing less than 19.5 percent oxygen.
 Failure to properly use and maintain this product could result in injury or death.
 All approved respirators shall be selected, fitted, used, and maintained in accordance with MSHA, OSHA, and other applicable regulations.
 Refer to User’s Instructions and/or maintenance manuals for information on use and maintenance of these respirators.
 Consult manufacturer’s User’s Instructions for information on the use, storage, and maintenance of these respirators at various temperatures.
 This respirator provides respiratory protection against inhalation of certain gas and vapor chemical agents, biological particulates, and radiological and nuclear dust particles. This respirator provides limited dermal (skin) protection to the head area and eyes.
 Eye irritation may be experienced based upon the CBRN agent and exposure (concentration and duration)
 Some CBRN agents may not present immediate effects from exposure, but can result in delayed impairment, illness, or death.
 CBRN Agents, depending on how they are used, may provide disabling effects as a result of skin exposure
 Direct contact with CBRN agents requires proper handling of the respirator after use. Correct disposal procedures must be followed.
 This respirator provides protection from certain inhalation hazards associated with fire.

These limitations are not all inclusive. The respirator manufacturer may also identify further cautions and limitations for their respirators. In addition, regulatory agencies may also place a limit on the use of respirators in their standards." 

Regardless of which type of escape respirator is chosen, training on the respirator is extremely important to ensure proper usage when an emergency occurs. It is also necessary for users to understand the operation of these respirators and to be fit tested to ensure proper fit so hazardous gases do not get past the seal and compromise the user's breathing when leaving an IDLH atmosphere. 

U.S. Government Usage

Multiple departments and agencies within the United States government have recently purchased masks for their employees to utilize in an emergency situation involving chemical, biological, radiological, and nuclear (CBRN) warfare agents. Unfortunately, the masks that were purchased have not been approved by NIOSH nor been completely validated for use during a CBRN event.

References

Breathing apparatus
Mine safety